The Bayer designation Psi Piscium (ψ  Psc, ψ  Piscium) is shared by three star systems in the constellation Pisces:

 Psi¹ Piscium (74 Piscium)
 Psi² Piscium (79 Piscium)
 Psi³ Piscium (81 Piscium)

Piscium, Psi
Pisces (constellation)